The Men's Softball European Championship is the main championship tournament between national men's softball teams in Europe, governed by the European Softball Federation.

Results

Medal table

See also
ESF Women's Championship

External links
European Softball Federation

References

International softball competitions
European championships
European Softball Championship
Men's sports competitions in Europe